The 2021–22 Bradley Braves men's basketball team represented Bradley University during the 2021–22 NCAA Division I men's basketball season. The Braves, led by seventh-year head coach Brian Wardle, played their home games at Carver Arena in Peoria, Illinois as members of the Missouri Valley Conference. They finished the season 17–14, 11–7 in MVC play to finish in fifth place. They lost to Loyola in the quarterfinals of the MVC tournament.

Previous season
In a season limited due to the ongoing COVID-19 pandemic, the Braves finished the 2020–21 season 12–16, 6–12 in MVC play to finish in eighth place. They lost to Southern Illinois in the first round of the MVC tournament.

Offseason

2021 recruiting class

Roster

Preseason 
In the conference's yearly preseason poll, Bradley was picked to finish in sixth place. Sophomore forward Rienk Mast was named to the preseason all-conference third team.

Schedule and results

|-
! colspan="9" style=| Exhibition

|-
! colspan="9" style=| Regular season

|-
!colspan=12 style=| MVC tournament

Source

References

2021-22
2021–22 Missouri Valley Conference men's basketball season
2021 in sports in Illinois